Panagiotis Stamogiannos (born 30 January 1992) is a Greek football player who plays for Aris Skalas as a central midfielder.

References

External links
 
Myplayer Profile

1992 births
Living people
Greek footballers
Greece youth international footballers
Olympiacos F.C. players
Doxa Drama F.C. players
Thrasyvoulos F.C. players
A.O. Kerkyra players
Vyzas F.C. players
Panegialios F.C. players
Association football midfielders
People from Laconia
Footballers from the Peloponnese